Hear & Now is the sixth studio album by American rock musician Billy Squier, released on June 14, 1989. It features his last Billboard Hot 100 hit, "Don't Say You Love Me", as well as popular fan favorites and radio hits "Don't Let Me Go", "Stronger" and "Tied Up", the latter two being co-written with Desmond Child.

The disc's lead single, "Don't Say You Love Me”, reached #4 on Billboard's Mainstream Rock Tracks and #58 on the Billboard Hot 100. Aided by a popular MTV music video, it became his best charting song since 1984's "Rock Me Tonite" and the last one to chart in Billboard Hot 100. The album marked a return to Squier's rougher hard rock sound following synth-heavy Signs of Life (1984) and polished Enough Is Enough (1986), with his arena rock slightly updated to late 1980s standards. On Billboard 200, the album had the second best chart debut of his career at #71, but ended up peaking only at #64, even lower than his previous album.

Hear & Now was and still is regarded as one of Squier's better albums by his fanbase, with most of them calling it his best since 1981's Don't Say No.

Track listing 

 "Too Much" was recorded during the sessions, but wasn't included on the original album. It was originally issued as a b-side for "Don't Say You Love Me" and is nowadays available to purchase from Squier's website, either alone or as a part of Hear & Now.

Personnel 

 Billy Squier - lead vocals, lead, rhythm and acoustic guitars, backing vocals
 Bobby Chouinard - drums
 Anton Fig - drums on tracks 3,4,6 & 10
 John McCurry - guitars
 Mark Clarke - bass
 Alan St. Jon - keyboards, synthesizers, backing vocals

Additional personnel 

 Mars Williams - saxophone ("Stronger")
 Eric Wessberg - mandoline ("Don't Let Me Go")
 Rob Hardin - synthesizer, additional arrangements ("Mine Tonite")
 Godfrey Diamond and Steven Scales - miscellaneous percussion
 The Uptown Horns - horns ("The Work Song")
 Doug Lubahn - additional backing vocals
 Godfrey Diamond - "Keith couldn't make it" vocal ("Stronger")
 Curtis King, Tawatha Agee, Brenda White-King - backing vocals ("The Work Song")

References

1989 albums
Billy Squier albums
Capitol Records albums